General elections were held in Ecuador on 19 May 1996, with a second round of the presidential elections on 7 July. Although Jaime Nebot of the Social Christian Party received the most votes in the first round, Abdalá Bucaram of the Ecuadorian Roldosist Party won the run-off with 54.5% of the vote. The Social Christian Party remained the largest in the Chamber of Deputies, winning 27 of the 82 seats.

Until the 2013 vote, this was the last election held after the natural expiration of a four-year presidential term. This due to a decade of political and economical instability that Ecuador experienced after Bucaram was impeached by the Congress in early 1997 and that lasted until Rafael Correa's inauguration in early 2007.

Results

President

National Congress

References

1996 in Ecuador
1996 elections in South America
Elections in Ecuador
Election and referendum articles with incomplete results